The 1937 County Championship was the 44th officially organised running of the County Championship. Yorkshire County Cricket Club won their 19th title.

Table
A minimum of 24 matches
15 points for a win
7.5 points to each side in a match where the scores finish level
5 points for first-innings lead in a drawn match
3 points for first-innings deficit in a drawn match
4 points to each side where the first-innings scores are level in a drawn match or where there is no result on first innings or where there is no play.
Positions decided by a percentage of points won against possible points available
Matches with the first two days washed out would then be played as one day matches and decided on first innings, with 10 points for the winner and 3 points for the loser.

References

1937 in English cricket
County Championship seasons